Paradarisa is a genus of moths in the family Geometridae described by Warren in 1894.

Species
Paradarisa consonaria (Hübner, 1799) – square spot
Paradarisa comparataria (Walker, 1866)

References

Boarmiini